The Marysville Braves were a minor league baseball team in the Class D Far West League in 1948 and 1949. They were an affiliate of the Boston Braves. In 1950, the team lost its Braves affiliation and became the Marysville Peaches.

References

External links
Baseball Reference

Marysville, California
Baseball teams established in 1948
Baseball teams disestablished in 1950
Defunct Far West League teams
Defunct baseball teams in California
Professional baseball teams in California
Boston Braves minor league affiliates
1948 establishments in California
1950 disestablishments in California
Far West League teams